

The June 15th North–South Joint Declaration was adopted between leaders of North Korea and South Korea in June 2000 after various diplomatic meetings between the North and South.  As a result of the talks, numerous separated families and relatives from the North and the South had meetings with their family members in Pyongyang and Seoul.

According to the North–South Joint Declaration, the North-South ministerial talks and North–South military working-level talks were held four times in Pyongyang, Seoul and Jeju Island from July to December 2000.

Text of North–South Joint Declaration

June 15, 2000

See also
Sunshine Policy
Inter-Korean summits
Unconverted long-term prisoners (the "unswerving Communists serving prison sentences in the South" referred to in point three)
Ten Point Programme for Reunification of the Country
July 4th North–South Korea Joint Statement
2007 North–South Summit Declaration
Panmunjom Declaration

References
 South-North Joint Declaration, June 15, 2000 (United States Institute of Peace)
 kcckp.net Naenara Webpage
 Text of Korean Armistice Agreement

External links

Article from "By our nation by itself"

North Korea–South Korea relations
2000 in North Korea
2000 in South Korea
2000 in international relations
2000 documents
June 2000 events in Asia
June 2000 events in South Korea